Gong is a German radio and (today, primarily) television listings magazine owned and published by the German media conglomerate Funke Mediengruppe.

An extract from the magazine, was featured in the secondary school early 90s German textbook Zickzack, as part of a reading exercise.

History and profile
The first edition of Gong appeared in October 1948. The magazine is published weekly and has its headquarters in Nuremberg. It was formerly based in Munich.

Since 1979, the magazine has awarded annual Goldener Gong prizes for outstanding achievement by actors, directors, writers, presenters, and producers in the German television world.

References

External links 
 Official website by Gong

1948 establishments in Germany
Weekly magazines published in Germany
German-language magazines
Listings magazines
Magazines established in 1948
Magazines published in Munich
Mass media in Nuremberg
Television magazines